Jon Steele is an American expat author living in Europe.

Biography
Jon Steele was born in Spokane, Washington, in 1950. His father, a flight engineer in the United States Air Force, was frequently transferred to military bases around the western United States and Steele lived in five states by the time he was ten years old.  In Montana, he graduated from Great Falls Central Catholic High School in 1968.  He attended College of Great Falls for one year before dropping out.  He moved to New York and worked as a janitor, waiter, liquor store clerk and postman. While in New York, Steele became an avid listener of WNEW-FM's Alison Steele (no relation), Scott Muni and Jonathan Schwartz. Inspired by the Album Oriented Rock format at its creative peak, Steele quit the Post Office in 1972 after obtaining his FCC 3rd Class Radio Operator's License.

He changed his name to Jon Steele in 1974 when he became an on-air presenter for KADE-AM and KBCO-FM (both in Boulder, Colorado).  Steele hosted the 6-10 evening slot on KBCO and gained a large audience along the Denver, Colorado front range.  Steele was known to push the bounds of the approved playlist and was fired for breaking with the format in 1980.

Journalism career
He worked as a freelance radio producer and announcer for KTCL, Fort Collins and KGNU, Boulder before moving to Washington DC in 1982 to work for National Public Radio.  Soon after arriving in Washington, DC, NPR faced bankruptcy (1983) and Steele's proposed job was eliminated before he started.  He began working in television as a soundman in the Washington Bureau of Independent Television News of London.  In 1986, Steele began working as a cameraman for the network and traveled extensively through the American continents and Caribbean covering news and features.  During this time Steele was credentialed to the White House and traveled internationally with both Presidents Reagan and Bush as part of the White House Press Corps.  He also covered three presidential campaigns across the United States.

In 1990, Steele was transferred to ITN's Moscow Bureau as cameraman/editor, where he worked until 1994.  While based in Moscow, Steele became internationally recognized for a body of work covering the collapse of social and governmental institutions throughout the former Soviet Union.  His footage of the fall of Sukhumi during the civil war in the former Soviet Republic of Georgia (September, 1993) was the basis of a ten-minute report on ITV's News at Ten called The Last Flight from Sukhumi.  The report was honored as 'Story of the Year' by the Royal Television Society and Steele received a citation for bravery from Le Press Club de France. The citation also included ITN reporter Julian Manyon and ITN Moscow producer Oleg Yuriev.  Steele's footage of the Russian military crackdown during the 1993 Russian constitutional crisis won 'Cameraman of the Year' from the Royal Television Society, as well as a BAFTA for factual television photography.  He shared the award with fellow ITN cameraman Eugene Campbell.  Steele was also awarded the Golden Nymph Award at the Monte Carlo Television Festival in the same year.

In April and May 1994, Steele travelled twice to Rwanda with ITV reporter James Mates to film the Rwandan genocide of Tutsi civilians at the hands of the Interahamwe, a Hutu paramilitary organization.  While in Kigali, rebel forces of the Tutsi led Rwandan Patriotic Front laid siege to the capital city of Kigali, then held by the Hutu led government.  Steele and Mates endured days of shelling and sniper fire while filming the desperate attempts of Canadian General Roméo Dallaire to protect innocent Rwandan civilians as well as his own UN Peacekeeping force.  Steele filmed the final battle and its aftermath near Kigali Airport, resulting in the mass exodus of Hutu military, paramilitary groups and civilians to  Zaire (renamed the Democratic Republic of the Congo in 1997).

In July 1994, while covering the Great Lakes refugee crisis, Steele spent weeks in the Hutu camps surrounding the border town of Goma, Zaire (DRC), filming amid horrendous conditions as many thousands of men, women and children died from cholera.

In August 1994, Steele worked with ITN reporter Terry Lloyd in Sarajevo.  There, Steele filmed the shooting death of a young girl near Sniper Alley.  Returning from the assignment, Steele collapsed at Heathrow airport from physical and emotional strain.  He was diagnosed with posttraumatic stress disorder but declined checking himself into a London treatment facility and returned to Moscow.  He accepted a transfer to ITN's Hong Kong bureau later that year.

Based in Hong Kong, Steele documented the final years of British rule over the colony.  He also travelled across China, Asia, Pakistan and India, filming breaking news stories and long-form features.  In 1996, he made three trips into Afghanistan filming the Taliban takeover of Kabul with ITN reporter Mark Austin.  Steele and Austin later left Kabul and circled around by way of the Salang Tunnel to join the Afghan warlord Ahmad Shah Massoud as he led Northern Alliance forces in an assault against the Taliban in Kabul.

After the transfer of sovereignty over Hong Kong to Chinese rule in 1997, Steele was assigned to ITN's Jerusalem Bureau where he worked across the Middle East and Arab-speaking Africa.  That same year he made the first of many trips to Iraq, then under the control of Saddam Hussein.  In 1998 Steele covered the escalating conflict between Serbian military forces and the Kosovo LIberation Army in the Serb controlled province of Kosovo, leading to the War in Kosovo. In June 1999, he spent weeks near the Albanian border town of Kukës covering the humanitarian crisis as hundreds of thousands of Albanians living in Kosovo were forced marched by Serb forces across the border. In the same year Steele was selected as pool cameraman for the British Army led NATO advance to Pristina.  It was thought the advance would take two days, but the point of the advance reached the outskirts of the capitol by sundown.  The British Army held up on the hill above the city to regroup and prepare to enter the city at dawn.  Steele went ahead into Pristina that night and drove to the Grand Hotel occupied by Serb officials, soldiers and members of the Belgrade-based press corps. He advised those present that the British Army was just outside the city and on the way.  The hotel began to empty out and Steele booked several rooms, and the ballroom, for members of the ITN production team traveling with the British Army.  He remained in Pristina for two more weeks filming British Forces as they secured the city and Kosovo.  ITN's coverage of the Kosovo War received 1999's Golden Nymph Award from the Monte Carlo Television Festival.  The  Second Intifada broke out in Jerusalem in September 2000, and Steele spent the next two years traveling across Israeli/Palestinian lines of control to film both sides of the conflict.

At the end of 2002, and with the Second Iraq War looming, Steele was based in Baghdad for five months in the lead up to the war.  However, on March 19, 2003, the day before the war began, he resigned from ITN citing professional and personal reasons.  He drove out of Baghdad the same night, reaching the Jordanian border as Coalition jets bombed nearby Iraqi positions.  Two days later, Steele received a message from ITN asking him to reconsider his resignation and return to Iraq.  Steele declined and went into seclusion in the Tuchan valley of southern France for ten months.  From 2004 - 2006, he lived between Lausanne, Switzerland and Amman, Jordan, writing stories based on his Iraq experiences in a work titled Saddamistan. The book remains unpublished.

Baker Boys: Inside the Surge
In 2007, Steele tuned into American news broadcasts for the first time since 2003.  He was shocked at the numbers of suicides among American soldiers serving in, or returning from Iraq and Afghanistan.  In 2008, after a four-month application process, Steele received permission from the United States Army Office of the Chief of Public Affairs in Los Angeles (OPCA-West) to travel alone to Combat Outpost Cahill near Salman Pak in the Southern Bowl region of Iraq. There, unsupported by any broadcast organization, he joined Baker Company of 15th Infantry Regiment, 3rd Infantry Division as they pushed into an Al Qaeda stronghold southeast of Salman Pak to establish Combat Outpost Carver.  Steele was given unrestricted and uncensored access to Baker Company over three months, and he recorded more than one hundred hours of tape in a 'fly-on-the-wall' documentary style, filming all aspects of the soldiers' lives from patrols to the chow line.  In his last weeks at COP Carver, he engaged members of Baker Company in one-on-one, confessional-style interviews wherein the soldiers expressed their emotions and feelings about the war.

Steele's work was edited into a four-part documentary series, Baker Boys: Inside the Surge. The program was first aired by HDNet in 2010, and received wide critical praise as well as eight awards.  The series has since been screened on Discovery Channel and several broadcast outlets including New Zealand, Canada, Australia and Europe.  It has also been made available on Netflix.

Jon Steele's career as a news cameraman was profiled in two documentaries: Jon Blair's Reporters at War (2004); and Martyn Burke's Under Fire: Journalists in Combat (2012).

Books 
Jon Steele's Moscow-based years (1990–1994) were the source material for War Junkie: One Man's Addiction to the Worst Places on Earth (Transworld, 2002), an autobiographical work documenting one year in the life of a front-line cameraman.  In a review for the London Evening Standard newspaper, journalist Sam Kiley called War Junkie "The most authentic literary recreation of the hollow terror, confusion and soul-crushing cacophony of battle I have read in decades."

In 2011, Steele's first novel, The Watchers was published in the United Kingdom by Transworld, and later in the United States by Blue Rider Press. It was the first part of a mystical noir thriller titled, "The Angelus Trilogy."  Part two of the trilogy, Angel City was published worldwide in 2012. The final book of the trilogy, The Way of Sorrows, was released in 2015. Blue Rider Press (Penguin/Random House) released the Angelus Trilogy as a box set in July 2016.

Published works
War Junkie, (2002) Transworld Publishers, London, 
The Watchers (2011, 2012) Transworld Publishers, London, ; Penguin Group, New York, 
Angel City (2013) Penguin Group, New York ; Transworld Publishers, London,  
The Way of Sorrows (2015) Penguin Group, New York,

References

External links
 Reporters at War http://truevisiontv.com/films/details/86/reporters-at-war
 Under Fire: Journalists in Combat http://underfirejournalistsincombat.webs.com
 Baker Boys: Inside the Surge http://dartcenter.org/content/baker-boys-inside-surge
 Baker Boys: Inside the Surge (Special Frontline Club edit) https://www.youtube.com/watch?v=VlOM0F8fzb4
 How the Angelus Trilogy Got Started http://upcoming4.me/news/book-news/story-behind-angel-city-by-jon-steele#.Uc1ScH7lmNc.twitter
 Radio, TV, War and Angels: an Audiobiography of Jon Steele http://djs.ozcatradio.com/?p=438
 https://www.facebook.com/jonsteeleauthor

American reporters and correspondents
Writers from Spokane, Washington
1950 births
Living people